World War II Heritage Cities

Savannah is the oldest city in the U.S. state of Georgia and is the county seat of Chatham County. Established in 1733 on the Savannah River, the city of Savannah became the British colonial capital of the Province of Georgia and later the first state capital of Georgia. A strategic port city in the American Revolution and during the American Civil War, Savannah is today an industrial center and an important Atlantic seaport. It is Georgia's fifth-largest city, with a 2020 U.S. Census population of 147,780. The Savannah metropolitan area, Georgia's third-largest, had a 2020 population of 404,798.

Each year, Savannah attracts millions of visitors to its cobblestone streets, parks, and notable historic buildings. These buildings include the birthplace of Juliette Gordon Low (founder of the Girl Scouts of the USA), the Georgia Historical Society (the oldest continually operating historical society in the South), the Telfair Academy of Arts and Sciences (one of the South's first public museums), the First African Baptist Church (one of the oldest African-American Baptist congregations in the United States), Temple Mickve Israel (the third-oldest synagogue in the U.S.), and the Central of Georgia Railway roundhouse complex (the oldest standing antebellum rail facility in the U.S. and now a museum and    visitor center).

Savannah's downtown area, which includes the Savannah Historic District, its 22 parklike squares, and the Savannah Victorian Historic District, is one of the largest National Historic Landmark Districts in the United States (designated by the federal government in 1966). Downtown Savannah largely retains the founder James Oglethorpe's original town plan, a design now known as the Oglethorpe Plan. During the 1996 Summer Olympics hosted by Atlanta, Savannah held sailing competitions in the nearby Wassaw Sound.

History

On February 12, 1733, General James Oglethorpe and settlers from the ship Anne landed at Yamacraw Bluff and were greeted by Tomochichi, the Yamacraws, and Indian traders John and Mary Musgrove. Mary Musgrove often served as an interpreter. The city of Savannah was founded on that date, along with the colony of Georgia. In 1751, Savannah and the rest of Georgia became a Royal Colony and Savannah was made the colonial capital of Georgia.

By the outbreak of the American Revolutionary War, Savannah had become the southernmost commercial port in the Thirteen Colonies. British troops took the city in 1778, and the following year a combined force of American and French soldiers, including Haitians, failed to rout the British at the Siege of Savannah. The British did not leave the city until July 1782. In December 1804 the state legislature declared Milledgeville the new capital of Georgia.

Savannah, a prosperous seaport throughout the nineteenth century, was the Confederacy's sixth most populous city and the prime objective of General William T. Sherman's March to the Sea. Early on December 21, 1864, local authorities negotiated a peaceful surrender to save Savannah from destruction, and Union troops marched into the city at dawn.

Savannah was named for the Savannah River, which probably derives from variant names for the Shawnee, a Native American people who migrated to the river in the 1680s. The Shawnee destroyed another Native people, the Westo, and occupied their lands at the head of the Savannah River's navigation on the fall line, near present-day Augusta. These Shawnee, whose Native name was Ša·wano·ki (literally, "southerners"), were known by several local variants, including Shawano, Savano, Savana and Savannah. Another theory is that the name Savannah refers to the extensive marshlands surrounding the river for miles inland, and is derived from the English term "savanna," a kind of tropical grassland, which was borrowed by the English from Spanish sabana and used in the Southern Colonies. (The Spanish word comes from the Taino word zabana.) Still other theories suggest that the name Savannah originates from Algonquian terms meaning not only "southerners" but perhaps "salt."

Geography
Savannah lies on the Savannah River, approximately  upriver from the Atlantic Ocean. Savannah is the primary port on the Savannah River and the largest port in the state of Georgia. It is also located near the U.S. Intracoastal Waterway.

Savannah is prone to flooding, due to abundant rainfall, an elevation at just above sea level, and the shape of the coastline, which poses a greater surge risk during hurricanes. The city currently uses five canals. In addition, several pumping stations have been built to help reduce the effects of flash flooding.

Climate
Savannah's climate is classified as humid subtropical (Köppen Cfa). In the Deep South, this is characterized by long and almost tropical summers and short, mild winters. Savannah records few days of freezing temperatures each year (and has rare snowfall). Due to its proximity to the Atlantic coast, Savannah rarely experiences temperatures as extreme as those in Georgia's interior.

Seasonally, Savannah tends to have hot and humid summers with frequent (but brief) thunderstorms that develop in the warm and tropical air masses, which are common. Although summers in Savannah are frequently sunny, half of Savannah's annual precipitation falls during the months of June through September. November and December are the driest months recorded at Savannah–Hilton Head International Airport. Each year Savannah reports 21 days on average with low temperatures below freezing, though in some years fewer than 10 nights will fall below freezing, and the city has even gone an entire winter season (that of 1879-80) without recording a freeze.

Savannah is at risk for hurricanes, particularly of the Cape Verde type of storms that take place during the peak of the season. Because of its location in the Georgia Bight (the arc of the Atlantic coastline in Georgia and northern Florida) as well as the tendency for hurricanes to re-curve up the coast, Savannah has a lower risk of hurricanes than some other coastal cities such as Charleston, South Carolina. Savannah was seldom affected by hurricanes during the 20th century, with one exception of being hit by Hurricane David in 1979.  However, the historical record shows that the city was frequently affected during the second half of the 19th century.  The most prominent of these storms was the 1893 Sea Islands hurricane, which killed at least 2,000 people. (This estimate may be low, as deaths among the many impoverished rural African Americans living on Georgia's barrier islands may not have been reported.)

Savannah was most recently affected by an active 2016 hurricane season, including Hurricane Matthew (which made a partial eyewall landfall), and was brushed by Hurricane Irma in 2017.

The first meteorological observations in Savannah probably occurred at Oglethorpe Barracks circa 1827, continuing intermittently until 1850 and resuming in 1866. The Signal Service began observations in 1874, and the National Weather Service has kept records of most data continually since then; since 1948, Savannah-Hilton Head International Airport has served as Savannah's official meteorological station.  Annual records (dating back to 1950) from the airport's weather station are available on the web.

Urban

Neighborhoods

Savannah is a city of diverse neighborhoods. More than 100 distinct neighborhoods can be identified in six principal areas of the city: Downtown (Landmark Historic District and Victorian District), Midtown, Southside, Eastside, Westside, and Southwest/West Chatham (recently annexed suburban neighborhoods).

Historic districts
Besides the Savannah Historic District, one of the nation's largest, five other historic districts have been formally demarcated:
 Savannah Victorian Historic District
 Cuyler–Brownsville District
 Thomas Square Historic District
 Pin Point Historic District
 Ardsley Park–Chatham Crescent Historic District

Demographics

According to the U.S. Census Bureau, Savannah's official 2020 population was 147,780, up from the official 2010 count of 136,286 residents. The Census Bureau's official 2020 population of the Savannah metropolitan area—defined by the Census Bureau as Bryan, Chatham, and Effingham counties—was 404,798, up 16.45% from the 2010 Census population of 347,611. Savannah is also the largest principal city of the Savannah–Hinesville–Statesboro–Jesup Combined Statistical Area, a larger trading area that includes the Savannah and Hinesville Metropolitan Statistical Areas as well as the Statesboro and Jesup Micropolitan Statistical Areas. The official 2020 population of this area was 597,465, up from 525,844 at the 2010 Census.

2020 census

As of the 2020 United States census, there were 147,780 people, 53,371 households, and 29,496 families residing in the city.

2010 census
In the official 2010 census of Savannah, there were 136,286 people, 52,615 households, and 31,390 families residing in the city. The racial makeup of the city was 55.04% Black, 38.03% White, 2.00% Asian, 0.03% Native American, 0.01% Pacific Islander, 0.93% from other races, and 2.01% from two or more races. Hispanic or Latino of any race were 4.07% of the population. Non-Hispanic Whites were 32.6% of the population in 2010, compared to 46.2% in 1990.

There were 51,375 households, out of which 28.5% had children under the age of 18 living with them, 35.2% were married couples living together, 21.7% had a female householder with no husband present, and 38.9% were non-families. 31.4% of all households were made up of individuals, and 11.5% had someone living alone who was 65 years of age or older. The average household size was 2.45 and the average family size was 3.13.

In the city, the age distribution was as follows: 25.6% were under the age of 18, 13.2% from 18 to 24, 28.5% from 25 to 44, 19.5% from 45 to 64, and 13.3% who were 65 years of age or older. The median age was 32 years. For every 100 females, there were 89.3 males. For every 100 females age 18 and over, there were 84.6 males.

The median income for a household in the city was $29,038, and the median income for a family was $36,410. Males had a median income of $28,545 versus $22,309 for females. The per capita income for the city was $16,921. About 17.7% of families and 21.8% of the population were below the poverty line, including 31.4% of those under age 18 and 15.1% of those age 65 or over.

Government

Savannah adopted a council-manager form of government in 1954. The city council consists of the mayor and eight aldermen, six of whom are elected from one of six aldermanic districts, with each district electing one member. The other two members and the mayor are elected at-large.

The council levies taxes, enacts ordinances, adopts the annual budget, and appoints the City Manager. The City Manager enacts the policies and programs established by council, recommends an annual budget and work programs, appoints bureau and department heads, and exercises general supervision and control over all employees of the city.

Police and fire departments
In 2003 Savannah and Chatham County voted to merge their city and county police departments. The Savannah-Chatham Metropolitan Police Department was established on January 1, 2005, after the Savannah Police Department and Chatham County Police Department merged.

In February 2018, the city and county governments ended the police department merger.  This reestablished both the Savannah Police Department and the Chatham County Police Department, and they now operate as two separate agencies. The departments have a number of specialty units, including K-9, SWAT, Bomb Squad, Marine Patrol, Dive, Air Support and Mounted Patrol. The 9-1-1 Communications Dispatch Center handles all 9-1-1 calls for service within the county and city, including fire and EMS. The Savannah Fire Department serves the City of Savannah, and there are separate municipal firefighting organizations elsewhere in Chatham County.

State representation
Derek Mallow (D) and Ben Watson (R) represent the Savannah area in the Georgia State Senate. Carl Gilliard (D), Anne Allen Westbrook (D), Ron Stephens (R), Edna Jackson (D) and Jesse Petrea (R) represent the area in the Georgia House of Representatives.

Prisons 
The Georgia Department of Corrections operates the Coastal State Prison in Savannah.

Economy

Agriculture was essential to Savannah's economy during its first two centuries. Silk and indigo production, both in demand in England, were early export commodities. By 1767, almost a ton of silk per year was exported to England.

Georgia's mild climate offered perfect conditions for growing cotton, which became the dominant commodity after the American Revolution. Its production under the plantation system and shipment through the Port of Savannah helped the city's European immigrants to achieve wealth and prosperity.

In the nineteenth century, the Port of Savannah became one of the most active in the United States, and Savannahians had the opportunity to consume some of the world's finest goods, imported by foreign merchants.  Savannah's port has always been a mainstay of the city's economy. In the early years of the United States, goods produced in the New World had to pass through Atlantic ports such as Savannah's before they could be shipped to England.

Savannah's first hotel, City Hotel, was completed in 1821. It also housed the city's first United States Post Office branch.

Between 1912 and 1968, the Savannah Machine & Foundry Company was a shipbuilder in Savannah.

The Port of Savannah, manufacturing, the military, and tourism have become Savannah's four major economic drivers in the twenty-first century.  In 2006, the Savannah Area Convention & Visitors Bureau reported over 6.85 million tourists to the city during the year. By 2011, the Bureau reported that the number of tourists the city attracted increased to 12.1 million. Lodging, dining, entertainment, and tourist-related transportation account for over $2 billion in tourist spending per year and employ over 17,000.

For years, Savannah was the home of Union Camp, which housed the world's largest paper mill. The plant is now owned by International Paper, and it remains one of Savannah's largest employers. Savannah is also home to the Gulfstream Aerospace company, maker of private jets, as well as various other large industrial interests. TitleMax is headquartered in Savannah. Morris Multimedia, a newspaper and television company, is also based in Savannah.

In 2000, JCB, the third-largest producer of construction equipment in the world and the leading manufacturer of backhoes and telescopic handlers, built its North American headquarters in Chatham County near Savannah in Pooler on I-95 near Savannah-Hilton Head International Airport.

Between 2009 and 2017, Savannah was North America's fourth-largest port for shipping container traffic. In 2019, the port continues to see record growth with a reported 4.5 million, 20-foot equivalent container units being moved in the fiscal year.

Arts and culture

Beyond its architectural significance as being the nation's largest, historically restored urban area, the city of Savannah has a rich and growing performing arts scene, offering cultural events throughout the year.

Books and literature
The Savannah Book Festival – an annual book fair held on Presidents' Day weekend in the vicinity of historic Telfair and Wright squares, includes free presentations by more than 35 contemporary authors. Special events with featured writers are offered at nominal cost throughout the year.
Flannery O'Connor Childhood Home – a museum house dedicated to the work and life of the acclaimed fiction writer Flannery O'Connor, who was born in Savannah and lived in the city until the age of fifteen. In addition to its museum, the house offers literary programming, including the annual Ursrey Lecture honoring American fiction writers.
Other notable authors with ties to Savannah include Conrad Aiken, Mary Kay Andrews, and James Alan McPherson. The songwriter Johnny Mercer was a native Savannahian.

Dance
 Savannah Ballet Theatre – established in 1998 as a nonprofit organization, it has grown to become the city's largest dance company.

Music

The Coastal Jazz Association – presents a variety of jazz performances throughout the year in addition to hosting the annual Savannah Jazz Festival.
Savannah Children's Choir – non-profit, auditioned choir for children in 2nd through 8th grades that performs throughout the community and in annual holiday and spring concerts.
Savannah Concert Association – presents a variety of guest artists for chamber music performances each season. Performances are generally held in the Lucas Theatre for the Arts.
Savannah Music Festival – an annual music festival of diverse artists which is Georgia's largest musical arts festival and is nationally recognized as one of the best music festivals in the world.
 The Savannah Orchestra – Savannah's professional orchestra, which presents an annual season of classical and popular concert performances.
The Savannah Philharmonic – professional orchestral and choral organization presenting year round concerts (classical, pops, education).
The Savannah Winds – amateur concert band hosted by the music department of Georgia Southern University.
The Armstrong Youth Orchestra – Savannah's professional orchestra for elementary, middle school, high school and some college students.
Annual Haitian Flag Day  – an annual festival of diverse artists, music, and various festivities.

Theater and performance
The American Traditions Vocal Competition – an annual vocal competition that desires to foster and preserve traditions of musical expression significant in the culture of the United States in the past and present. The Competition includes the Johnny Mercer Award.
Savannah Children's Theatre – a nonprofit, year-round drama theater company geared toward offering elementary through high school students (and adults) opportunities for participation in dramatic and musical productions.
Savannah Community Theatre – a full theater season with a diverse programming schedule, featuring some of Savannah's finest actors in an intimate, three-quarter-round space.
Little Theatre of Savannah – founded in 1950, The Little Theatre of Savannah, Inc., is a nonprofit, volunteer-based community organization dedicated to the celebration of the theater arts. Recognizing the unique social value, expressive fulfillment and opportunity for personal growth that theater provides its participants, the Little Theatre of Savannah invites all members of the community to participate both on- and off-stage.
The Savannah Theatre – Savannah's only fully professional resident theater, producing music revues with live singers, dancers and the most rockin' band in town. Performances happen year-round, with several different titles and a holiday show.
The Savannah Repertory Theatre – part of the cultural fabric of Savannah since 2016 and the city's only nonprofit professional theater.
Lucas Theatre for the Arts – founded in December 1921, the Lucas Theatre is one of several theaters owned by the Savannah College of Art and Design. It hosts the annual Savannah Film Festival.
Trustees Theater – once known as the Weis Theater, which opened February 14, 1946, this theater reopened as the Trustees Theater on May 9, 1998, and hosts a variety of performances and concerts sponsored by the Savannah College of Art and Design. SCAD also owns the building.
Odd Lot Improv – founded in 2010, a family-friendly improv comedy troupe performing weekly shows on Mondays and Fridays.
House of Gunt – alternative drag collective founded in 2013 with monthly shows at Club One on top of other performances around the city throughout the year.

Visual and community arts
Art Rise Savannah, Inc. – a local community nonprofit devoted to increasing access to the arts and improving opportunities for artists in the city.

Points of interest

Savannah's architecture, history, and reputation for Southern charm and hospitality are internationally known. The city's former promotional name was "Hostess City of the South," a phrase still used by the city government. An earlier nickname was "the Forest City", in reference to the large population of live oak trees that flourish in the Savannah area. These trees were especially valuable in shipbuilding during the 19th century. In 2019, Savannah attracted 14.8 million visitors from across the country and around the world.  Savannah's downtown area is one of the largest National Historic Landmark Districts in the United States.

The city's location offers visitors access to the coastal islands and the Savannah Riverfront, both popular tourist destinations. Tybee Island, formerly known as "Savannah Beach", is the site of the Tybee Island Light Station, the first lighthouse on the southern Atlantic coast. Other picturesque towns adjacent to Savannah include the shrimping village of Thunderbolt and three residential areas that began as summer resort communities for Savannahians: Beaulieu, Vernonburg, and the Isle of Hope.

The Savannah International Trade & Convention Center is located on Hutchinson Island, across from downtown Savannah and surrounded by the Savannah River. The Belles Ferry connects the island with the mainland, as does the Eugene Talmadge Memorial Bridge.

The Georgia Historical Society, an independent educational and research institution, has a research center in Savannah. The research center's library and archives hold the oldest collection of materials related to Georgia history.

The Savannah Civic Center on Montgomery Street is host to more than nine hundred events each year.

Savannah has consistently been named one of "America's Favorite Cities" by Travel + Leisure. In 2012, the magazine rated Savannah highest in "Quality of Life and Visitor Experience." Savannah was also ranked first for "Public Parks and Outdoor Access," visiting in the Fall, and as a romantic escape. Savannah was also named as America's second-best city for "Cool Buildings and Architecture," behind only Chicago.

The mile-long Jones Street has been described as one of the most charming streets in America.

Squares

Savannah is noted for its 22 squares, small parks arranged along five historic streets running north to south. Each street has from three to five squares. The squares vary in size and character, from the formal fountain and monuments of the largest, Johnson, to the playgrounds of the smallest, Crawford. Elbert, Ellis, and Liberty Squares are classified as the three "lost squares," destroyed in the course of urban development during the 1950s. Elbert and Liberty Squares were paved over to make way for a realignment of U.S. highway 17, while Ellis Square was demolished to build the City Market parking garage. The city restored Ellis Square after razing the parking garage. The garage has been rebuilt as an underground facility, the Whitaker Street Parking Garage, and it opened in January 2009. The restored Ellis Square opened in March 2010. Separate efforts are now under way to revive Elbert and Liberty Squares.

Franklin Square is the site of Savannah's Haitian Monument, which commemorates the heroic efforts of the Chasseurs-Volontaires de Saint-Domingue in the 1779 Siege of Savannah and for an independent America. One of the few black regiments to fight for the American side in the Revolutionary War, the soldiers were recruited from present-day Haiti, until 1804 the French colony of Saint-Domingue. Chippewa Square honors the Battle of Chippawa during the War of 1812. It features a large statue of James Oglethorpe, the city's founder. In popular culture, the square is the location of the park bench seen in the 1994 film Forrest Gump from which the title character dispenses wisdom to others waiting for a bus.

Because both Calhoun Square (the official name until 2022) and Whitefield Square were named for prominent slaveholders, a movement was begun in 2021 to rename them Sankofa Square and Jubilee Square, respectively.

Historic churches and synagogues

Savannah has numerous historic houses of worship.

Founded in 1733, with the establishment of the Georgia colony, Christ Church (Episcopal) is the longest continuous Christian congregation in Georgia. Early rectors include the Methodist evangelists John Wesley and George Whitefield. Located on the original site on Johnson Square, Christ Church continues as an active congregation.

The Independent Presbyterian Church, which was founded in 1755, is located near Chippewa Square.  The church's current sanctuary (its third) dates from the early 1890s.

The First Bryan Baptist Church is an African American church that was organized by Andrew Bryan in 1788.  The site was purchased in 1793 by Bryan, a former slave who had also purchased his freedom.  The first structure was erected there in 1794.  By 1800, the congregation was large enough to split: those at Bryan Street took the name of First African Baptist Church, and Second and Third African Baptist churches were also established.  The current sanctuary of First Bryan Baptist Church was constructed in 1873.

In 1832, a controversy over doctrine caused the First African Baptist congregation at Bryan Street to split.  Some members left, taking with them the name of First African Baptist Church.  In 1859, the members of this new congregation (most of whom were slaves) built their current church building on Franklin Square.

In 1874, the St. Benedict the Moor Church was founded in Savannah, the first African-American Catholic church in Georgia, and one of the oldest in the Southeast.

The oldest standing house of worship is First Baptist Church (1833), located on Chippewa Square. Other historic houses of worship in Savannah include: Cathedral of St. John the Baptist (Roman Catholic), Temple Mickve Israel (the third oldest synagogue in the U.S.), and St. John's Church (Episcopal).

Historic homes

Among the historic homes that have been preserved are: the Olde Pink House, the Sorrel–Weed House, Juliette Gordon Low's birthplace, the Davenport House Museum, the Green–Meldrim House, the Owens–Thomas House, the William Scarbrough House, and the Wormsloe plantation of Noble Jones. Mercer Williams House, the former home of Jim Williams in Monterey Square, is the main location of Midnight in the Garden of Good and Evil.

Opulent buildings that succumbed to fire include the mansions at Bonaventure Plantation and Greenwich Plantation.

Historic cemeteries
Colonial Park Cemetery was the city's principal burial ground for much of the eighteenth century, when Georgia was a British colony. Laurel Grove Cemetery, with the graves of many Confederate soldiers and African American slaves, was Savannah's chief municipal cemetery during the nineteenth century. Bonaventure Cemetery is a former plantation and the final resting place for some illustrious Savannahians. Also located in Savannah are the Mordecai Sheftall Cemetery and the Levi Sheftall Family Cemetery, which both date back to the second half of the eighteenth century.

Historic forts
Fort Jackson (named for the Georgia politician James Jackson, not Andrew Jackson) lies on the Savannah River, one mile east of Savannah's Historic District. Built between 1808 and 1812 to protect the city from attack by sea, it was one of several Confederate forts defending Savannah from Union forces during the Civil War. The Union Army bombarded Fort Pulaski in April 1862 with the aid of a new rifled cannon. Confederate troops soon surrendered, and the cannon effectively rendered all brick fortifications obsolete.

Other registered historic sites

Savannah Historic District (buildings) and the Savannah Victorian Historic District
Forsyth Park
Juliette Gordon Low Historic District
Central of Georgia Railroad: Savannah Shops and Terminal Facilities and Central of Georgia Depot and Trainshed – a  historic district that was listed on the National Register of Historic Places in 1978.
John P. Rousakis Riverfront Plaza and Factors Walk – River Street's pedestrian promenade, restored nineteenth-century cotton warehouses and passageways include shops, bars and restaurants.
City Market – Savannah's restored central market and popular nightlife destination features antiques, souvenirs, small eateries, as well as two large outdoor plazas.
Savannah State University campus and Walter Bernard Hill Hall – The Georgia Historical Commission and the Georgia Department of Natural Resources have recognized both the Savannah State campus and Hill Hall as a part of the Georgia Historical Marker Program.  Hill Hall, which was built in 1901, was added to the National Register of Historic Places in 1981.
Telfair Museum of Art and Telfair Academy of Arts of Sciences – the South's first public art museum.
Wormsloe Plantation – the partially restored house and grounds of an 18th-century Georgia plantation.

Shopping
Various centers for shopping exist about the city including Abercorn Common,  Savannah Historic District, Oglethorpe Mall, Savannah Mall and Abercorn Walk.

Other attractions
 American Prohibition Museum – Located in Savannah's City Market, this unique museum displays the history of prohibition in America from 1907 to 1933. It also traces the roots of NASCAR, which developed from the era's bootlegging operations.
 Clary's Cafe – featured in both the 1994 book and 1997 film Midnight in the Garden of Good and Evil.
 Club One – former home of The Lady Chablis and also featured in Midnight in the Garden of Good and Evil.
 Coastal Georgia Botanical Gardens – a developing botanical garden located at Bamboo Farm, a former USDA plant-introduction station south of Savannah that began operations in 1919.
 Crystal Beer Parlor, the city's oldest restaurant.
 Oatland Island Wildlife Center – located east of Savannah, a facility owned and operated by the Savannah-Chatham County Board of Education and featuring wildlife from surrounding coastal Georgia and South Carolina.
 Leopold's Ice Cream, a popular ice cream parlor.
 Ossabaw Island – an environmentally protected and commercially undeveloped barrier island south of Savannah.
 Pinkie Masters Bar – a popular Savannah watering hole and the site of presidential visits and political campaigns. Pinkie Masters was a local political figure and a friend of President Jimmy Carter, who made several visits to the bar and the city.
 Pirates' House – historic restaurant and tavern located in downtown Savannah.
 Ralph Mark Gilbert Civil Rights Museum – a museum dedicated to African-American history in Savannah.
Skidaway Island – an affluent suburban community south of Savannah that hosts Skidaway Island State Park, the University of Georgia Aquarium and the Skidaway Institute of Oceanography.
 Waving Girl statue, honoring Florence Martus.

Sports and recreation
Portions of the East Coast Greenway, a 3,000-mile-long (5,000 kilometer) system of trails from Maine to Florida, run through Savannah.

Professional sport teams

College teams

Education

Savannah hosts four colleges and universities offering bachelor's, master's, and professional or doctoral degree programs: Georgia Southern University-Armstrong Campus, Savannah College of Art and Design (SCAD), Savannah State University, and South University.  In addition, Georgia Tech Savannah offers certificate programs, and Georgia Southern University has a satellite campus in the downtown area. Savannah Technical College, a two-year institution, and the Skidaway Institute of Oceanography, a marine science research institute of the University of Georgia located on the northern end of Skidaway Island, offer educational programs as well. Savannah is also the location of Ralston College, a liberal arts college founded in 2010.

Mercer University began a four-year doctor of medicine program in August 2008 at Memorial University Medical Center.  Mercer, with its main campus in Macon, received additional state funding in 2007 to expand its existing partnership with Memorial by establishing a four-year medical school in Savannah (the first in southern Georgia).  Third- and fourth-year Mercer students have completed two-year clinical rotations at Memorial since 1996; approximately 100 residents are trained each year in a number of medical practices.  The expanded program opened in August 2008 with 30 first-year students.

Savannah Law School, which opened in 2012 in the historic Candler building on Forsyth Park, ceased operations in 2018.

Savannah is also home to most of the schools in the Chatham County school district, the Savannah-Chatham County Public Schools.

Notable secondary schools in Savannah-Chatham County include the following. (Public schools are indicated with an asterisk.)

Beach High School*
Benedictine Military School
Calvary Day School
Groves High School*
Islands High School*
Jenkins High School*
Johnson High School*
New Hampstead High School*
Saint Andrew's School
St. Vincent's Academy
Savannah Arts Academy*
Savannah Christian Preparatory School
Savannah Country Day School
Savannah High School*
Windsor Forest High School*

Oatland Island Wildlife Center of Savannah  is also a part of the Savannah-Chatham County Public Schools. An environmental education center, it serves thousands of students from throughout the Southeastern United States. Located east of Savannah on a marsh island, it features a  Native Animal Nature Trail that winds through maritime forest, salt marsh, and freshwater wetlands. Along the trail, visitors can observe native animals such as Florida panthers, Eastern timber wolves, and alligators in their natural habitat.

Media

Savannah's major television stations are WSAV-TV, channel 3 (NBC); WTOC-TV, channel 11 (CBS); WJCL, channel 22 (ABC); and WTGS, channel 28 (Fox). Two PBS member stations serve the city: WVAN (channel 9), part of Georgia Public Broadcasting; and WJWJ-TV (channel 16), part of SCETV.

Other stations include channel 3.2 (The CW).

The Georgia Gazette was the Georgia colony's first newspaper and was published in Savannah beginning April 7, 1763. Today the Savannah Morning News is Savannah's only remaining daily newspaper. It first appeared on January 15, 1850 as the Daily Morning News. Both the Savannah Tribune and the Savannah Herald are weekly newspapers with a focus on the city's African-American community. Connect Savannah is a free weekly newspaper focused on local news, culture and music.
The Coastal Buzz is the metro area's only media company dedicated to "positive news." It is owned by Positive Life Media.

Infrastructure

Transportation

Savannah/Hilton Head International Airport is located off Interstate 95 west of Savannah. The airlines serving this airport year-round are Allegiant Air, American Airlines, American Eagle, Delta, Delta Connection, JetBlue, Silver Airways, Southwest Airlines and United Express. Air Canada Express, Frontier Airlines, Sun County Airlines and United Airlines offer seasonal services only.

Amtrak operates a passenger terminal at Savannah for its Palmetto and Silver Service trains, which run between New York City and Miami. (Three southbound and three northbound trains make daily stops at the Savannah terminal).

Public transit throughout the region is assured by Chatham Area Transit (CAT). There are 17 fixed routes, plus the CAT's dot (downtown transportation) system, which provides fare-free bus service on the Forsyth Loop and Downtown Loop, as well as free passage to and from Hutchinson Island via the Savannah Belles Ferry.

Interstates and major highways
 Interstate 95 — Runs north–south just west of the city; provides access to Savannah/Hilton Head International Airport and intersects with Interstate 16, which leads into the city's center.
 Interstate 16 — Terminates in downtown Savannah at Liberty and Montgomery streets, and intersects with Interstate 95 and Interstate 516.
 Interstate 516 — An urban perimeter highway connecting southside Savannah, at DeRenne Avenue, with the industrialized port area of the city to the north; intersects with the Veterans Parkway and Interstate 16 as well. Also known as Lynes Parkway.
 U.S. Route 80 (Victory Drive) — Runs east–west through midtown Savannah and connects the city with the town of Thunderbolt and the islands of Whitemarsh, Talahi, Wilmington and Tybee. Merges with the Islands Expressway and serves as the only means of reaching the Atlantic Ocean by automobile.
 U.S. Route 17 (Ocean Highway) — Runs north–south from Richmond Hill, through southside Savannah, into Garden City, back into west Savannah with a spur onto I-516, then I-16, and finally continuing over the Talmadge Memorial Bridge into South Carolina.
Harry S. Truman Parkway — Runs through eastside Savannah, connecting the east end of downtown with southside neighborhoods. Construction began in 1990 and opened in phases (the last phase, connecting with Abercorn Street, was completed in 2014).
Veterans Parkway — Links Interstate 516 and southside/midtown Savannah with southside Savannah, and is intended to move traffic quicker from north–south by avoiding high-volume Abercorn Street. Also known as the Southwest Bypass.
 Islands Expressway — An extension of President Street to facilitate traffic moving between downtown Savannah, the barrier islands and the beaches of Tybee Island.

Crime
The total number of violent crimes in the Savannah-Chatham County reporting area ran just above 1,000 per year from 2003 through 2006.  In 2007, however, the total number of violent crimes jumped to 1,163. Savannah-Chatham has recorded between 20 and 25 homicides each year since 2005.

In 2007, Savannah-Chatham recorded a sharp increase in home burglaries but a sharp decrease in larcenies from parked automobiles. During the same year, statistics show a 29 percent increase in arrests for Part 1 crimes.

An additional increase in burglaries occurred in 2008 with 2,429 residential burglaries reported to Savannah-Chatham police that year. That reflects an increase of 668 incidents from 2007. In 2007, there were 1,761 burglaries, according to metro police data.

Savannah-Chatham police report that crimes reported in 2009 came in down 6 percent from 2008.

In 2009, 11,782 crimes were reported to metro police — 753 fewer than in 2008. Within that 2009 number is a 12.2 percent decrease in violent crimes when compared with 2008. Property crimes saw a 5.3 percent decline, which included a 5.2 percent reduction in residential burglary. In 2008, residential burglary was up by almost 40 percent. While some violent crimes increased in 2009, crimes like street robbery went down significantly. In 2009, 30 homicides were reported, four more than the year before. Also, 46 rapes were reported, nine more than the year before. In the meantime, street robbery decreased by 23 percent.  In 2008, metro police achieved a 90 percent clearance rate for homicide cases, which was described as exceptional by violent crimes unit supervisors. In 2009, the department had a clearance rate of 53 percent, which police attributed to outstanding warrants and grand jury presentations.

The SCMPD provide the public with up-to-date crime report information through an online mapping service. This information can be found here. 2015 saw a dramatic increase in the number of violent crimes, including at least 54 deaths due to gun violence, a number not seen since the early 1990s. The first quarter of 2018 saw crime trending downward, compared to 2017.

Sister cities
Savannah's sister cities are:
Batumi, Georgia
Halle, Germany
Jiujiang, China
Kaya, Burkina Faso
Patras, Greece

Unincorporated suburbs of Savannah
Savannah's unincorporated suburbs within Chatham County include several located on urbanized barrier islands east of the city.
 
 Dutch Island
 Georgetown
 Henderson
 Isle of Hope
 Montgomery
 Skidaway Island
 Talahi Island
 Whitemarsh Island
 Wilmington Island

Notable people

See also

 USS Savannah, 6 ships

Notes

References

Further reading
 Coffey, Thomas F., Jr. (1994). Only in Savannah: Stories and Insights on Georgia's Mother City. Savannah: Frederic C. Beil. .

External links

Official website 
www.visitsavannah.com — Official Site of the Savannah Convention & Visitors Bureau
www.seda.org — Savannah Economic Development Authority
Savannah Historic Newspapers Archive — Digital Library of Georgia
Virtual Historic Savannah Project 

Stuart A. Rose Manuscript, Archives, and Rare Book Library, Emory University: Savannah (Ga.). District and Port records, 1861

 
Cities in Chatham County, Georgia
Cities in Georgia (U.S. state)
County seats in Georgia (U.S. state)
Georgia
Populated coastal places in Georgia (U.S. state)
Populated places established in 1733
Port cities and towns in Georgia (U.S. state)
Savannah metropolitan area
World War II Heritage Cities